This is a list of former regional Australian rules football leagues in South Australia

See also
South Australian Country Football Digest - Peter Lines

References

External links

South Australia
 
Lists of sports events in Australia